Clifford Lyne (born 24 April 1970) is a South African swimmer. He competed in three events at the 1992 Summer Olympics.

References

External links
 

1970 births
Living people
South African male swimmers
Olympic swimmers of South Africa
Swimmers at the 1992 Summer Olympics
Place of birth missing (living people)